"Aquarela do Brasil" ('Watercolor of Brazil'), written by Ary Barroso in 1939 and known in the English-speaking world simply as "Brazil", is one of the most famous Brazilian songs.

Background and composition
Ary Barroso wrote "Aquarela do Brasil" in early 1939, when he was prevented from leaving his home one rainy night due to a heavy storm. Its title, a reference to watercolor painting, is a clear reference to the rain. He also wrote "Três lágrimas" (Three Teardrops) on that same night, before the rain ended.

Describing the song in an interview to Marisa Lira, of the newspaper Diário de Notícias, Barroso said that he wanted to "free the samba away from the tragedies of life, of the sensual scenario already so explored". According to the composer, he "felt all the greatness, the value and the wealth of our land", reliving "the tradition of the national panels".

Initially, he wrote the first chords, which he defined as "vibrant", and a "plangent of emotions". The original beat "sang on [his] imagination, highlighting the sound of the rain, on syncope beats of fantastic tambourins". According to him, "the rest came naturally, music and lyrics at once". He declared to have felt like another person after writing the song.

Release and reception
Before being recorded, "Aquarela do Brasil", initially named "Aquarela brasileira", was performed by the baritone  on Joujoux e Balangandans, a benefit concert sponsored by Darci Vargas, then the First Lady of Brazil. It was then recorded by Francisco de Morais Alves, arranged by Radamés Gnattali and his orchestra, and released by Odeon Records in August 1939. It was also recorded by Araci Cortes, but despite the singer's huge popularity at the time, the song was not a success.

"Aquarela do Brasil" took a while to succeed. In 1940, it was not among the top three songs of that year's Carnival in Rio. The president of the jury was Heitor Villa-Lobos, and Barroso, offended that his masterpiece was not on the list, ended his relationship with him. The two men would only speak to each other again fifteen years later, when both received the National Order of Merit.

The song only became famous after it was included in Walt Disney's 1942 animated film Saludos Amigos, sung by Aloísio de Oliveira. After that, the song became known not only in Brazil, but worldwide, becoming the first Brazilian song to be played over a million times on American radio. Due to the huge popularity achieved in the United States, it received an English version by songwriter Bob Russell.

It was voted by the Brazilian edition of Rolling Stone as the 12th greatest Brazilian song.

Controversy
This musical movement, with its extremely patriotic nature, was seen by many as being favorable to the dictatorship of Getúlio Vargas, generating criticism towards Barroso and his work, which was perceived as Barroso's prostration to the regime. The Barroso family, however, strongly denies these claims, pointing out that he also wrote an anti-Nazi song named "Salada Mista" (Mixed salad), recorded by Carmen Miranda in October 1938. Vargas, although not a fascist himself, was as sympathetic to such regimes in the early years of his presidency as the European governments of the time.

The Department of Press and Propaganda, the official censorship body of the regime, wanted to censor the verse "terra do samba e do pandeiro" ("land of samba and the pandeiro"), which was seen as being "derogatory" for Brazil's image. Barroso persuaded the censors to keep the line.

Some criticism to the song, at the time, was that it used expressions little known by the general public, such as "inzoneiro", "merencória", and "trigueiro" (intriguing, melancholic, and swarthy), and that he was too redundant in the verses "meu Brasil brasileiro" ("my Brazilian Brazil") and "esse coqueiro que dá coco" ("this coconut palm that produces coconut"). The composer defended his work, saying that these expressions were poetic effects inseparable from the original composition. On the original recording, Alves sang "mulato risoneiro" (laughing mulatto) instead of "inzoneiro" because he was unable to understand Barroso's illegible handwriting.

Lyrics

The Portuguese lyrics are as sung by Francisco Alves (chorus in brackets). The S. K. Russel English version is from the sheet music by Southern Music Publishing Company. The tune of the first four lines of the introduction is the same as the first instrumental break in the Alves version.

Notable recordings
The song has received many successful recordings through the years, being played in many different genres, ranging from its original samba genre to disco. It is one of the 20 most recorded songs of all time.

In 1943, Spanish-born bandleader Xavier Cugat reached number two on the Best Sellers List and number nine on the Harlem Hit Parade with his version of "Brazil". Django Reinhardt recorded "Brazil" three times between 1947 and 1953. In 1957, Frank Sinatra recorded the song in Come Fly With Me. He was followed by other successful artists of the time such as Bing Crosby, Ray Conniff, and Paul Anka.

During the Brazilian military dictatorship, MPB singer Elis Regina performed what is perhaps the darkest version ever of "Aquarela do Brasil", accompanied by a chorus of men reproducing chants of the Native Brazilians. In 1975, American band The Ritchie Family reached number-one on the Billboard Hot Dance Club Play chart for seven weeks and number eleven Pop with their disco version of the song.Other successful Brazilian singers such as Antônio Carlos Jobim, Erasmo Carlos, João Gilberto (with Caetano Veloso, Gilberto Gil, and Maria Bethânia), Gal Costa, and Simone also recorded versions of the song at the same period.

The song was featured prominently in Terry Gilliam's 1985 film Brazil, which was named after it. It was recorded by Geoff Muldaur for the soundtrack, but parts of the song were also incorporated throughout the orchestral score by Michael Kamen, including a Kate Bush version. Afterwards, in the 1990s, it was recorded by both Harry Belafonte and Dionne Warwick.

In 2007, singer-songwriter Daniela Mercury, which recorded the most recent cover of the song by a Brazilian artist, was invited to perform the song at the end of the opening ceremony of the XV Pan American Games, held in Rio de Janeiro.

In 2009, the Recording Academy added the 1942 recording of "Brazil (Aquarela do Brasil)" by Jimmy Dorsey & His Orchestra, released as Decca 18460B, to the Grammy Hall of Fame.  Jimmy Dorsey was the first to record the song on July 14, 1942, and release it with the English lyrics by Bob Russell sung by Bob Eberly and Helen O'Connell.

Also in 2009, American band Beirut performed "Brazil" for their live DVD Beirut: Live At The Music Hall Of Williamsburg.

ITV used a cover of this song by Thiago Thomé as the theme song for their coverage of the 2014 FIFA World Cup which took place in Brazil in June and July 2014. During the tournament's opening ceremony, its first verses were performed live by Brazilian singer Claudia Leitte before being joined onstage by Pitbull and Jennifer Lopez to sing "We Are One (Ole Ola)".

In 2021, the Michael Kamen (Brazil movie) arrangement was used by agency VCCP as the soundtrack for the Transport for London post-COVID advertising campaign, #LetsDoLondon.

{| class="wikitable sortable"
|-
! Year
! Artist
! Album
! Source
|-
| 1939 
| Francisco Alves
| Odeon 11768 (78 rpm record)
| 
|-
| 1942 
| Sylvio Caldas
| 78 rpm record
|
|-
| 1942 
| Xavier Cugat
| 78 rpm record
|
|-
| 1947
| Django Reinhardt
| Quintette du Hot Club de France
| 
|-
| 1957
| Frank Sinatra
| Come Fly With Me
|
|-
| 1958
| The Coasters
| The Coasters
| 
|-
| 1958
| Bing Crosby and Rosemary Clooney
| Fancy Meeting You Here
|
|-
| 1958
| The Four Freshmen
| Voices In Latin
|
|-
| 1960
| Ray Conniff
| Say It with Music (A Touch of Latin)
| []
|-
| 1963
| Paul Anka
| Our Man Around the World
| []
|-
| 1965
| The Shadows
| The Sound of The Shadows
|
|-
| 1968
| Geoff & Maria Muldaur
| Pottery Pie
| []
|-
| 1969
| Elis Regina
| Honeysuckle Rose Aquarela Do Brasil
| []
|-
| 1970
| Antônio Carlos Jobim
| Stone Flower
| []
|-
| 1970
| Erasmo Carlos
| Erasmo Carlos & Os Tremendões
| []
|-
| 1974
| Santana
| Lotus (quoted in "Samba Pa Ti")
|
|-
| 1975
| Elis Regina
| A Arte de Elis Regina
| []
|-
| 1975
| Crispy & Co.
| Tonight at the Discotheque
| 
|-
| 1975
| The Ritchie Family
| Brazil
| 
|-
| 1976
| Chet Atkins and Les Paul
| Guitar Monsters
| [] 
|-
| 1980
| Gal Costa
| Aquarela do Brasil
| []
|-
| 1980
| Simone
| Ao Vivo
| []
|-
|-
| 1981
| João Gilberto, Caetano Veloso and Gilberto Gil
| Brasil
|
|-
| 1981
| Tav Falco's Panther Burns
| Behind The Magnolia Curtain
| 
|-
| 1984
| Egberto Gismonti and Naná Vasconcelos
| Duas Vozes
|-
| 1987
| Ney Matogrosso
| Pescador de Pérolas
| []
|-
| 1990
| Harry Belafonte
| Around the World with the Entertainers
| []
|-
| 1991
| Deborah Blando
| A Different Story
| []
|-
| 1995
| Dionne Warwick
| Aquarela do Brazil
| []
|-
| 1995
| 8½ Souvenirs
| Happy Feet
| 
|-
| 1997
| Gal Costa
| Acústico (Mtv)
| []
|-
| 1997
| Pink Martini
| Sympathique
|  
|-
| 1998
| Vengaboys
| The Party Album
| 
|-
| 1999
| Jun Miyake
| Glam Exotica!
| 
|-
| 2000
| Rosemary Clooney
| Brazil
| []
|-
| 2002
| Cornelius
| Point
|
|-
| 2002
| Metrô
| Déjà-Vu
|
|-
| 2004
| Martinho da Vila
| Apresenta Mané do Cavaco
| []
|-
| 2005
| Arcade Fire
| "Cold Wind" (B-side)"Rebellion (Lies)" (B-side)
|
|-
| 2005
| Daniela Mercury
| Balé Mulato
| []
|-
| 2005
| Plácido Domingo
| Lo Essencial de
| []
|-
| 2007
| Chick Corea & Béla Fleck
| The Enchantment
| []
|-
| 2009
| Beirut
| Beirut: Live At The Music Hall Of Williamsburg (DVD)
| 
|-
| 2009
| The Spinto Band
| Slim and Slender
|  
|-
| 2012
| Tokyo Ska Paradise Orchestra
| ''Walkin|
|-
| rowspan="3" | 2014
| Claudia Leitte
| We Are One (World Cup Opening Ceremony Version)
|
|-
| Loona
| Brazil
|
|-
| Bellini
| Festival
|
|-
|2016
|Leslie Odom, Jr.
|Leslie Odom, Jr. 
|
|}

Usage in popular cultureFilmsTelevision programs'''

References

External links
 Ary Barroso, Giant of Brazilian Song by Daniella Thompson

1939 songs
1943 singles
1930s jazz standards
1975 singles
Brazilian songs
Carmen Miranda songs
Disco songs
Music controversies
The Ritchie Family songs
Brazilian patriotic songs
Portuguese-language songs
Samba songs
Song recordings produced by Jacques Morali
Songs with lyrics by Bob Russell (songwriter)
Songs written by Ary Barroso
Songs about Brazil
Jazz compositions in C major
Decca Records singles
20th Century Fox Records singles